Uluçınar can refer to:

 Uluçınar, İmamoğlu
 Uluçınar, Kemah